Croma may refer to:

 Croma (programming language), a dialect of the Lisp programming language
 Cromā, an Indian retailer of consumer electronics
 Giulio Croma (died 1632), an Italian painter
 Fiat Croma, a car
 Italian for an eighth note in music

See also
 Chroma (disambiguation)